Shobdon Aerodrome  is an airport  west of Leominster, Herefordshire, England.

RAF Shobdon
Shobdon started as a British Army camp. It acted as a reception point for casualties received from Southampton being distributed to local hospitals. With a depot railway station developed on the Leominster and Kington Railway, its first casualties arrived after the Battle of Dunkirk.

The camp was developed further by the United States Army from 1943, to act as a distribution point for two locally developed general hospitals. They also added a runway in co-operation with the Royal Air Force, but due to the marshy land only one runway was developed.

In 1943, RAF No. 1 Glider Training School moved from RAF Thame to Shobdon, enabling an increase in training of glider pilots in preparation for Normandy and Arnhem landings.

The RAF Gliding School closed in 1953, when the site was handed to Herefordshire County Council.

Today

Shobdon Aerodrome has a Civil Aviation Authority (CAA) Ordinary Licence (Number P779) that allows flights for the public transport of passengers or for flying instruction as authorised by the licensee (Herefordshire Aero Club Limited). It is frequently used by air taxi services to Europe.

It is operated by Herefordshire Aero Club who provide light aircraft flight training together with aircraft storage and maintenance services.

Other air sports facilities based at Shobdon Airfield are:
 Shobdon LAA Strut a kit-build group hold monthly social evenings
 Tiger Helicopters offer helicopter flight training and maintenance.
 Swift Light Flight microlight club and training school.
 Herefordshire Gliding Club and training school.

From 1963 to 1990 Herefordshire Parachute Club was very active but now parachuting is no longer available at the airfield.

References

Citations

Bibliography

 Brooks, Robin J. Herefordshire and Worcestershire Airfields in the Second World War. 
 Pfuell, Ivor. A History of Shobdon. Published by Ivor Pfuell, 1994. .
 United Kingdom AIP

 Tony Hobbs  "Flying For Fun in the Southern Marches"  Published by: Longaston Press.

External links

Airports in England
Airports in the West Midlands (region)
Gliderports in the United Kingdom
Transport in Herefordshire